Capital FC is an American soccer team based in Salem, Oregon, United States. Although founded in 2008 as part of the development system for the Portland Timbers USSF D2 organization, beginning in 2011 they were part of the development system for the Major League Soccer franchise of the same name until 2022. The team plays in USL League Two, the fourth tier of the American Soccer Pyramid. The Men's team is known as Capital Futbol Club Atletico. The Women's team, who plays in the USL W League, is known as Capital Futbol Club Atletica.

History
The Timbers joined the PDL in 2009, and played their first ever game on May 9, 2009, against fellow expansion franchise Victoria Highlanders finishing 2–2, with the first goal in franchise history being scored by Jarad Van Schaik assisted by Matt Van Houten.

In 2017, the team announced it would be based out of Salem, in affiliation with Capital FC Timbers.

On April 1, 2022, Capital FC Timbers announced that they were severing all ties with the Portland Timbers and renamed the USL League Two team Capital FC Atletico.

Players

Current roster

Notable former players

This list of notable former players comprises players who went on to play professional soccer after playing for the team in the Premier Development League, or those who previously played professionally before joining the team.

  Fatai Alashe
  Travis Bowen
  Freddie Braun
  Graham Dugoni
  Logan Emory
  Sterling Flunder
  Jake Gleeson
  Miguel Guante
  Erik Hurtado
  Mutanda Kwesele
  Daniel Leach
  Jason McLaughlin
  Andrew Ribeiro
  Brent Richards
  Thomas Ryan
  Ross Smith
  Warren Ukah
  Jarad vanSchaik
  Cameron Vickers
  Collen Warner
  Emery Welshman
  Khiry Shelton
  Mark Sherrod
  Eric Miller

Year-by-year

Honors

Portland Timbers U23
USL PDL Champions 2010
 USL PDL Regular Season Champions 2010
 USL PDL Western Conference Champions 2010
 USL PDL Northwest Division Champions 2010, 2017
 USL League Two Western Conference Champions 2021
 USL League Two Northwest Division Champions 2021

Capital FC
 USL League Two Northwest Division Champions 2022

Head coaches
  Matt Broadhead (2022–present)
  Aaron Lewis (2017–2021) 
  Jim Rilatt (2009–2016)

Stadiums

 John Chambers Field at CFC Complex; Salem, Oregon (2022–present)
 McCulloch Stadium; Salem, Oregon (2017–2021)
 Providence Park; Portland, Oregon (2009–2016)
 Tualatin Hills Park; Beaverton, Oregon one game (2009)
 Kiggins Bowl; Vancouver, Washington three games (2009–2011)
 Lincoln Park Stadium at Pacific University; Forest Grove, Oregon two games (2009)
 Stadium at Tigard High School; Tigard, Oregon two games (2009–2010)
 Hare Field; Hillsboro, Oregon two games (2010–2011)
 Stadium at Gresham High School; Gresham, Oregon one game (2010)
 Stadium at Clackamas High School; Clackamas, Oregon one game (2011)
 Stadium at Sherwood High School; Sherwood, Oregon one game (2011)
 Doc Harris Stadium at Camas High School; Camas, Washington one game (2011)

References

External links
 
 USL League Two Website

Soccer clubs in Oregon
USL League Two teams
Association football clubs established in 2008
2008 establishments in Oregon
Capital FC